The 1991–92 Associate Members' Cup, known as the 1991–92 Autoglass Trophy, was the ninth staging of the Associate Members' Cup, a knock-out competition for English football clubs in the Third Division and the Fourth Division. The winners were Stoke City and the runners-up were Stockport County.

The competition began on 15 October 1991 and ended with the final on 16 May 1992 at Wembley Stadium.

In the first round, there were two sections split into eight groups: North and South. In the following rounds each section gradually eliminates teams in knock-out fashion until each has a winning finalist. At this point, the two winning finalists faced each other in the combined final for the honour of the trophy.

Preliminary round 
Byes to first round: Rotherham United and Chesterfield

Northern Section

Southern Section

First round

Northern Section

Southern Section

Quarter-finals

Northern Section

Southern Section

Area semi-finals

Northern Section

Southern Section

Area finals

Northern Area final

Southern Area final

Final

Notes
General
statto.com

Specific

EFL Trophy
Tro